The Battle of Borowe Mlyny, one of many skirmishes of the January Uprising, took place on April 16, 1863, near the village of Borowe Mlyny in southeastern part of Russian-controlled Congress Poland. 300 Polish insurgents under Colonel Marcin Borelowski clashed with approximately 1,000 soldiers of the Imperial Russian Army.

Borelowski and his party camped in a forest between the villages of Majdan Sopocki and Borowiec. They were spotted by Russians, whose garrison was stationed in Tarnogród. The Russians immediately sent approximately 1,000 soldiers, who attacked the Poles. While some Polish insurgents decided to fight, others fled through nearby border to Austrian Galicia. Polish and Russian losses in the skirmish are unknown.

References

Sources 
 Stefan Kieniewicz: Powstanie styczniowe. Warszawa: Państwowe Wydawnictwo Naukowe, 1983. .
 Stanisław Zieliński: Bitwy i potyczki 1863–1864, Rapperswil 1913

Conflicts in 1863
1863 in Poland
Borowe Mlyny
Lublin Governorate
April 1863 events